Eqology is a Norway-based multi-level marketing company established in 1998 with operations in most of Europe. Eqology develops, produces and distributes nutrition and skin care products through independent distributors.

In March 2019, Eqology AS has 42 employees and about 7,000 independent distributors serving approximately 40,000 customers in the European area. Eqology AS’ headquarter is at Oslo, Norway.

The company was called SHINE until 15 April 2011 when the company had a complete re-branding and changed the name to Eqology. The company became publicly listed on 9 September 2010. Eqology was delisted from Oslo Axess in December 2015.

In 2017 the company was present in Norway, Denmark, Sweden, Finland, Estonia, Latvia, Lithuania, Austria, The Netherlands, Germany, Switzerland and Belgium. Later on Poland, Hungary, Romania, Czech Republic and Slovakia were added to the area served.

References

External links
Official Website
Nutonic Website
Vegas Cosmetics

Cosmetics companies of Norway
Multi-level marketing companies
Companies based in Bærum
Norwegian brands